This list of botanical gardens and arboretums in Maryland is intended to include all significant botanical gardens and arboretums in the U.S. state of Maryland

See also
List of botanical gardens and arboretums in the United States

References 

 
Arboreta in Maryland
botanical gardens and arboretums in Maryland